Gilbert James Kuhn (January 5, 1915 – April 12, 2006) was an American football player and coach. 
He played college football for the USC Trojans under head coach Howard Jones and was drafted by the Brooklyn Dodgers of the National Football League (NFL) in 1937. Kuhn served as the head football coach at the University of San Diego in 1956.

References

1915 births
2006 deaths
American football centers
New York Yankees (1936 AFL) players
People from Placentia, California
Players of American football from California
San Diego Toreros athletic directors
San Diego Toreros football coaches
Sportspeople from Orange County, California
USC Trojans football players